Patrick Alexander Vans Agnew (1822–1848) was a British civil servant of the East India Company, whose murder during the Siege of Multan by the retainers of Dewan Mulraj led to the Second Sikh War and to the British annexation of the Punjab region.

Background

Vans Agnew was the second son of Lieutenant-Colonel Patrick Vans Agnew, a Madras officer of considerable reputation, and afterwards a director of the East India Company.

India
After a very successful career at Haileybury College, where he gave evidence of superior talent and of judgment and force of character in advance of his years, Agnew joined the Bengal civil service in March 1841, and in the following year commenced his official life as assistant to the commissioner of the Delhi division. In December 1845 he was appointed assistant to Major George Broadfoot, the superintendent of the Cis-Sutlej states, and was present at the Battle of Sobraon early in 1846. He was subsequently employed in settling the boundaries of the territory of Maharaja Gulab Singh, the new ruler of Kashmir, and in a mission to Gilgit.

Chain of Events
In the spring of 1848, being then assistant to the resident at Lahore, he was sent to Multan with instructions to take over the government of that province from Mulraj, the Nazim or governor, who had applied to be relieved of it, and to make it over to Sardar Kahan Singh Mann, a Sikh noble, remaining himself in the capacity of political agent to introduce a new system of finance and revenue. On this mission he was accompanied by Lieutenant W. A. Anderson, of the Bombay Army, who had been his assistant on his mission to Gilgit, and also by Sardar Kahan Singh Mann, the dewan designate, and an escort of Sikh troops. The mission reached Multan on 18 April 1848. On the following day Agnew and Anderson were visited by Mulraj, and some discussion, not altogether harmonious, took place as to the terms upon which the province should be given over, Agnew demanding that the accounts for the six previous years should be produced. On 20 April, the two English officers inspected Multan Fort and the various establishments, and on their return to their camp in company with Mulraj were attacked and wounded (Anderson severely) by the retainers of Mulraj, who immediately rode off at full speed to his country residence. The two wounded Englishmen were placed by their attendants in an idgah, or fortified temple, where, on the following day, their Sikh escort having gone over to the enemy, they were brutally murdered by the adherents of Mulraj.

This incident, so important in its political results, produced a profound sensation throughout India. Both the murdered officers, though young in years (Agnew would have been twenty-six had he lived one day longer), had already established a high reputation in the public service. Anderson had some time previously attracted the favourable notice of Sir Charles Napier in Sind, and the duties upon which Agnew had been employed, including his last most responsible and, as the event proved, fatal mission, sufficed to show the high estimation in which his services were held. Nor was it only as a rising public servant that Patrick Vans Agnew's death was mourned. In private life his brave, modest, and unselfish nature had won the esteem and affection of all who knew him. "If," wrote Sir Herbert Edwardes to one of his nearest relatives, "few of our countrymen in this land of death and disease have met more untimely ends than your brother, it has seldom been the lot of any to be so honoured and lamented."

Monument
A monument was erected for Vans Agnew after the Siege of Multan.

References

British East India Company civil servants
People educated at Haileybury and Imperial Service College
1822 births
1848 deaths